Zaw Weik (7 March 1911 – 25 November 2000) was a Burmese weightlifter who represented India. He competed in the men's middleweight event at the 1936 Summer Olympics. In 1946, he formed the Burma Olympic Committee.

References

1911 births
2000 deaths
Burmese male weightlifters
Indian male weightlifters
Olympic weightlifters of India
Weightlifters at the 1936 Summer Olympics
People from Yangon Region